Emigrante del Mundo is the debut studio album by Portuguese–French reggaeton recording artist Lucenzo, released on 30 September 2011 through Yanis Records and licensed to B1M1 Recordings.

Track listing

Chart performance
Based on the successes of The album "Danza Kuduro" and the title song "Emigrante del Mundo", the album proved successful in France reaching #8 in the SNEP official French Singles Chart.

References 

2011 debut albums
Lucenzo albums